Laccaria fraterna  is a species of Laccaria from Australia growing in Eucalyptus and Acacia introduced into the United States.

References

External links
 
 

fraterna